The Brudaremossen mast is a  high mast in Delsjön in eastern Gothenburg, Sweden, built in 1980 to replace the overloaded, 20-year-old TV tower.

Brudaremossen TV tower is a 70-metre (230 ft) high concrete tower with a guyed lattice steel mast on its top. The complete structure is 172 metres (564 ft) tall. An observation deck is located 60 metres above the ground in the concrete tower.

See also
List of masts

References

External links
 http://skyscraperpage.com/diagrams/?b38289
 http://skyscraperpage.com/diagrams/?b58784
 
 http://perso.orange.fr/tvignaud/galerie/etranger/s-goteborg-brudarmossen.htm

Buildings and structures in Gothenburg
Towers in Sweden